The inferior longitudinal muscle of tongue is an intrinsic muscle of the tongue. It is situated on the under surface of the tongue between the genioglossus and hyoglossus. It is innervated by the hypoglossal nerve (cranial nerve XII). Its contraction shortens and thickens the tongue.

Structure 
The inferior longitudinal muscle of the tongue is an intrinsic muscle of the tongue. It is thin and oval in cross-section. It is situated between the paramedian septum, and the lateral septum. It extends from the root to the apex of the tongue. Posteriorly, some of its fibers attach onto the body of the hyoid bone. Anteriorly, its fibres blend with those of the styloglossus, hyoglossus, and genioglossus to form the ventral area of the tip of the tongue.

Innervation 
The inferior longitudinal muscle of the tongue is supplied by the hypoglossal nerve (CN XII).

Function 
Contraciton of the inferior longitudinal muscle of the tongue shortens and thickens the tongue.

Additional images

References 

Muscles of the head and neck
Tongue